Gulnara Yuryevna Sultanova (born August 23, 1975) is a Russian civilian and LGBT activist, director of the International LGBT-Film Festival Side by Side and coordinator of the LGBT organization Coming Out and  Russian-German Exchange.  Known for numerous speeches in the media in connection with human rights issues regarding gays and lesbians. In 2010 she was a member of the jury of the Teddy Award of the Berlin Film Festival.

References

External links
 История МКФ «Бок о бок»
  Интервью с организаторами ЛГБТ-фестиваля

1975 births
Living people
Russian LGBT rights activists
Russian human rights activists
Women human rights activists
Women civil rights activists